Kandawgyi Gardens or Kandawgyi Park may refer to:

 Kandawgyi Gardens, Mandalay, Myanmar
 National Kandawgyi Botanical Gardens, Pyin Oo Lwin, Myanmar
 Kandawgyi Nature Park, Yangon, Myanmar